Dennis Bennett may refer to:
Dennis Bennett (baseball) (1939–2012), Major League Baseball player
Dennis Bennett (priest) (1917–1991), American Episcopal priest